District 24 of the Oregon State Senate comprises parts of Clackamas and Multnomah counties. It is currently represented by Kayse Jama, who was appointed unanimously by the Clackamas and Multnomah County Board of Commissioners to replace Shemia Fagan who was recently elected Oregon Secretary of State.

Election results
District boundaries have changed over time, therefore, senators before 2013 may not represent the same constituency as today. From 1993 until 2003, the district covered the southern Oregon Coast, and from 2003 until 2013 it covered a slightly different area in the Portland metropolitan area.

References

24
Clackamas County, Oregon
Multnomah County, Oregon